An automaton clock or automata clock is a type of striking clock featuring automatons. Clocks like these were built from the 1st century BC through to Victorian times in Europe. A Cuckoo clock is a simple form of this type of clock.

The first known mention is of those created by the Roman engineer Vitruvius, describing early alarm clocks working with gongs or trumpets. Later automatons usually perform on the hour, half-hour or quarter-hour, usually to strike bells. Common figures in older clocks include Death (as a reference to human mortality), Old Father Time, saints and angels. In the Regency and Victorian eras, common figures also included royalty, famous composers or industrialists.

More recently constructed automaton clocks are widespread in Japan, where they are known as karakuri-dokei. Notable examples of such clocks include the Nittele Ōdokei, designed by Hayao Miyazaki to be affixed on the Nippon Television headquarters in Tokyo, touted to be the largest animated clock in the world. In the United Kingdom, Kit Williams produced a series of large automaton clocks for a handful of British shopping centres, featuring frogs, ducks and fish.

References

Mechanical engineering
Clock designs
Articles containing video clips
Karakuri